Enduring Love is a 2004 British psychological thriller film directed by Roger Michell and written by Joe Penhall, based on the 1997 novel of the same name by Ian McEwan. 

The story concerns two strangers who become dangerously close after witnessing a deadly accident. It stars Daniel Craig, Rhys Ifans and Samantha Morton with Bill Nighy, Susan Lynch and Corin Redgrave.

Plot
Joe has planned an afternoon in the English countryside with his partner, Claire. As they prepare to open a bottle of champagne, a hot air balloon drifts into the field. The pilot catches his leg in the anchor rope, while the only passenger, a boy, is too scared to jump down. 

Joe and three other men rush to secure the basket. Just as they grab on, wind rushes into the field, and at once the rescuers are airborne. Joe manages to drop to the ground, as do the others, except for one who is lifted into the sky. They watch as the man falls to his death. 

Recalling the events at dinner with his friends Robin, Rachel, and Claire, Joe reveals the impact the incident has had on his battered psyche. The balloon eventually landed safely, the boy unscathed. Joe later goes to retrieve the body of the fallen man with fellow rescuer Jed Parry. Jed feels an instant connection with Joe—one that, as the weeks go by, becomes ever more intense.

Days later, Joe, feeling guilty, spends time trying to map out ways that could have saved the man. One day, he receives a phone call from Jed, telling him to come outside so that they can talk about what happened. Joe looks out of the window and sees Jed standing across the road from his house staring up at Joe's window. Joe is reluctant but Jed promises that he will leave Joe alone if he comes outside and talks to him. After Jed makes some comments that make Joe uneasy, he decides to leave, telling Jed to leave him alone. 

Not too long after this, Joe visits a local bookshop and Jed shows up, appearing to have followed him. Joe is confused and angered by this and tells him that he does not want to see him at all. Jed is hurt by this and continues to tell Joe to "be brave" and admit what passed between them at the field.

Joe then visits the wife of the man who had died and she tells him she believes he was having an affair after the police returned a picnic basket for two that was found in his car, along with an unknown woman's scarf. After hearing this, he decides to work out who was with the man on the day he died.

The next morning, Claire comes down the stairs and tells Joe that it is over between them. He, angry, pays a visit to Jed and they argue. Joe then gets drunk before going to Robin and Rachel's house, where he stays the night. When he wakes up, his friend tells him Claire just called and asked him to come over as Jed was in their house. 

Joe races to his house and enters the living room, finding Jed and Claire sitting next to each other on the sofa. Jed looks as if he has been beaten up and falsely blames Joe. Claire appears to believe Jed's story. Joe loses his temper and then out of the blue, Jed stabs Claire with a kitchen knife and she falls to the floor, bleeding profusely. Joe then pretends to accept Jed into his life and they kiss. As they kiss, Joe grabs hold of the knife from Jed and stabs him. Jed falls to the floor, while Joe rushes to Claire's aid and phones an ambulance.

Joe returns to the field where it all started, with the wife and daughter of the man who died. They are joined by a couple who explain that the woman's husband had not cheated on her but was giving the couple a lift in his car. The picnic basket and scarf were theirs, and they were too embarrassed to intercede, as they were having an affair. The wife is happy to discover the truth and said that she had believed her husband was cheating. Joe then tells the man's daughter her father was very brave.

Mid-way through the credits, there is a scene in a psychiatric hospital, where it is revealed that Jed survived the stabbing and is sitting at a desk writing ominously, turning to smile at the camera.

Cast
 Daniel Craig as Joe, the main protagonist of the movie
 Rhys Ifans as Jed, the main antagonist of the movie
 Samantha Morton as Claire
 Bill Nighy as Robin
 Susan Lynch as Rachel
 Justin Salinger as Frank
 Ben Whishaw as Spud
 Andrew Lincoln as TV Producer
 Helen McCrory as Mrs. Logan
 Anna Maxwell Martin as Penny
 Corin Redgrave as The Professor

Critical response
The film received mixed reviews. Rotten Tomatoes assigned the film a score of  based on  reviews. The site's critical consensus reads, "While it strains credibility and isn't ultimately as profound as it might first appear, Enduring Love is still an intriguing thriller fueled by strong performances from Rhys Ifans and Daniel Craig."

 
Empire, however, voted it number 426 on their list of the 500 greatest films ever made.

At RogerEbert.com, the film received 3 of 4 stars. The reviewer points out the film is among the few dealing with the fact that sometimes, we have a choice about what happens and how we react. It causes the viewer to ask, What would I have done?

The Guardian's Rob Mackie describes the film's opening scene as startling and beautifully shot, a 'vivid, colourful scene - bright red balloon, bright blue sky, bright green grass.' This is contrasted with the subsequential muted and downbeat. Giving the film a 3 out of 5 stars, he describes it as a 'thoughtful philosophical inquiry (which) becomes a less convincing thriller'. It 'intrigues but ultimately disappoints'.

Calling the film a 'jokeless gloomarama,' The New Yorker's Anthony Lane wrote, 'The ideas behind “Enduring Love” may be fascinating, but they don’t play; they sulk.' He feels the lack of grip persists to the finale and the climax feels clenched and ridiculous.

Giving the film a 4 out of 5 stars, Nev Pierce of BBC News Online desccribes the film as, 'An intelligent and gripping dramatic thriller, Enduring Love is a real rarity: a film better than the book.' While admitting it isn't flawless, he calls it both ambitious and vigorous, and worthy of viewers' attention.

See also
 Erotomania, the disorder depicted in the book and film.

References

External links
 
 
 

2004 films
2004 LGBT-related films
2004 psychological thriller films
2004 thriller drama films
2000s English-language films
2000s psychological drama films
British LGBT-related films
British psychological drama films
British psychological thriller films
British thriller drama films
Film4 Productions films
Films about stalking
Films based on British novels
Films directed by Roger Michell
Films shot in London
Films shot in Oxfordshire
LGBT-related controversies in film
LGBT-related thriller drama films
Films about mental health
Pathé films
2000s British films